Smedvik is a surname. Notable people with the surname include:

Harald Smedvik (1888–1956), Norwegian gymnast
Ragnvald Smedvik (1894–1975), Norwegian footballer

See also
Smedvig (surname)

Norwegian-language surnames